Ismael Santos (born April 26, 1972 in Orense, Spain) is a retired basketball player. As a member of Real Madrid, he won the Euroleague title in 1995, being selected to the EuroLeague All-Final Four Team in the process. In 1997, Santos was instrumental as Real Madrid won the Saporta Cup.

Santos played six times for the Spanish national team.

Awards
Liga ACB (2): 1992–93, 1993–94
Copa del Rey (1): 1992–93
Euroleague (1): 1994–95
Saporta Cup (1): 1996–97

References
ACB.com profile
Fibaeurope.com
FIBA.com profile

1972 births
Living people
Liga ACB players
Point guards
Real Madrid Baloncesto players
Spanish men's basketball players
Dafnis B.C. players
Pallacanestro Treviso players